The National Council of Churches in Australia (NCCA) is an ecumenical organisation bringing together a number of Australia's Christian churches in dialogue and practical cooperation.

The NCCA works in collaboration with state ecumenical councils around Australia. It is an associate council of the World Council of Churches, a member of the Christian Conference of Asia and a partner of other national ecumenical bodies throughout the world. "Act for Peace" is the international aid agency of the NCCA, which aims to empower war-torn communities to protect refugees, reduce poverty, prevent conflicts and manage disasters.

Background
The modern ecumenical movement began to take shape at the end of the 19th century. Initiatives among students and between church mission agencies led the way. In Australia these included the Australian Student Christian Movement, formed in 1896, and the National Missionary Council, created in 1926.

Organised ecumenism in Australia at the national church level was first formalised through the Australian Committee for the World Council of Churches (1946). This movement initially involved only the Anglican and Mainline Protestant churches. In the 1960s and '70s, however, Eastern and Oriental Orthodox churches joined the ecumenical movement. This developed into the Australian Council of Churches (ACC). Following the Second Vatican Council, the Roman Catholic Church in Australia began exploring possibilities for relationships with other churches.  In 1994 the National Council of Churches in Australia (NCCA) succeeded the ACC, with the Catholic Church as a member.

Logo 
The symbol of the boat has long been used to represent the ecumenical movement, and its origins are unclear - perhaps in the Gospel story of the calling of the Galilean fishermen to be disciples - "fishers of men". The boat represents the Christian Church as a ship sailing the sea that is the world. The mast, in the shape of the cross, recalls the Christian faith.

The NCCA's version of the boat includes waves and the Southern Cross and was adopted at the formation of the NCCA in 1994. The use of the Southern Cross identifies the NCCA's geographical location.

An updated version of the logo, pictured above, was adopted in 2006.

Member churches
The NCCA currently comprises 18 member churches:

Presidents

General secretaries

Source: National Council of Churches in Australia website

See also
Christianity in Australia
Margaret Holmes (ecumenist)

References

External links
Official website 
State ecumenical councils
Act for Peace

Christian organisations based in Australia
Australia
Christian organizations established in 1994
1994 establishments in Australia